Lyubomir Epitropov  (born 27 April 1999) is a Bulgarian swimmer. He competed in the men's 100 metre breaststroke event at the 2018 FINA World Swimming Championships (25 m), in Hangzhou, China.

References

External links
 

1999 births
Living people
Bulgarian male swimmers
Male breaststroke swimmers
People from Veliko Tarnovo
Swimmers at the 2020 Summer Olympics
Olympic swimmers of Bulgaria
Tennessee Volunteers men's swimmers
Sportspeople from Veliko Tarnovo Province